The Great Ecstasy of Robert Carmichael is a 2005 British crime film directed by Thomas Clay in his feature-length directorial debut and written by Clay and Joseph Lang. It stars Daniel Spencer as the titular character, a teenager whose life spirals out of control after experimenting with drugs with schoolmates.

Plot
An introverted, socially awkward, middle-class youth, Robert Carmichael, is a talented cello player but is bored by his existence in the coastal town of Newhaven. He becomes associated with several other unsavory teenagers, and is soon tempted into the use of hard drugs like cocaine and ecstasy. At one point, the gang rapes a teenage girl in a squalid flat. Though Robert does not participate in this act, when the gang later attacks a middle-aged couple, and rapes the woman, Robert participates in that act.

Main cast
 Daniel Spencer as Robert Carmichael
 Lesley Manville as Sarah Carmichael
 Danny Dyer as Larry Haydn
 Ryan Winsley as Joe
 Charles Mnene as Ben
 Michael Howe as Jonathan Abbott
 Miranda Wilson as Monica Abbott
 Grace Kemp as concert goer

Recognition
The film was shown at the Edinburgh Film Festival and also the Cannes Film Festival as part of the Critic's Week sidebar, where it was nominated for the Camera d'Or award.

References

External links
 Review in Variety "Ultra violent and nauseating, but technically dazzling."
 
Britfilms review and information

2005 films
2005 crime drama films
British crime drama films
British independent films
Films about rape
2005 directorial debut films
2005 independent films
2000s English-language films
2000s British films